Coye Elvis Dunn (March 7, 1916 – February 8, 2000) was an American football defensive back in the National Football League for the Washington Redskins.  He played college football at the University of Southern California.

1916 births
2000 deaths
People from Baca County, Colorado
American football defensive backs
USC Trojans football players
Washington Redskins players